Helen Talbot (April 7, 1924  January 29, 2010) was a motion picture actress and pin-up girl in the United States.  She was born Helen Darling in Concordia, Kansas and lived there until 1941 when she moved to live with her brother in West Los Angeles, California.

Talbot starred in at least 23 films and television projects, including a number of westerns as a leading lady. Her appearances include King of the Forest Rangers, Corpus Christi Bandits, and Trail of Kit Carson. She also had a lead role in Federal Operator 99.

Partial filmography
 Pistol Packin' Mama (1943)
 California Joe (1943)
 Canyon City (1943)
 Outlaws of Santa Fe (1944)
 Faces in the Fog (1944)
 Corpus Christi Bandits (1945)
 Lone Texas Ranger (1945)
 Federal Operator 99 (1945)
 Trail of Kit Carson (1945)
 King of the Forest Rangers (1946)

References

External links

 
 Helen Talbot fan page

1924 births
2010 deaths
20th-century American actresses
Actresses from Kansas
American film actresses
Female models from Kansas
Paramount Pictures contract players
People from Concordia, Kansas
21st-century American women